The Legal, Financial and Administrative Services Agency is a Swedish administrative authority under the Ministry of Finance. Established in 1539 by King Gustav Vasa, it is the oldest public agency in Sweden.

Role
It is tasked with providing various services within the public sector, in particular qualified legal and economic expertise, public administration, asset- and risk management. Kammarkollegiet represents the State in indemnity cases, speaks on behalf of the public in certain cases involving the Environmental Code, and in other matters as decided by the Chancellor of Justice. The agency is also responsible for the registration of religious communities, the appointment of those entitled to officiate weddings, setting rates for funeral charges, the authorisation of travel guarantees and use of interpreters and translators. Kammarkollegiet also monitors the State Inheritance Fund's interests and manages its capital. In addition to this, the agency also deals with changes to the regional division of Sweden, and exemptions from the testamentary provisions governing foundations.

References

External links
Kammarkollegiet - Official Site (Swedish)
Kammarkollegiet - Official Site (English)

Government agencies of Sweden
1539 establishments in Sweden